Małgorzata Maria Wypych is a Polish politician. She serves as a member of the Polish Parliament.

References

Living people
Women members of the Sejm of the Republic of Poland
1971 births